Crenicichla ploegi is a species of cichlid native to South America. It is found swimming in Brazil.

Etymology
The fish is named in honor of Dutch ichthyologist Alex Ploeg, whose Ph.D. thesis dealt with the taxonomic revision, biogeography and phylogeny of Crenicichla, and who published papers on the systematics of the genus from 1986 to 1991, describing a total of 23 species, eighteen of which are still considered valid; afterwards, he worked as interlocutor between the ornamental fish industry and other institutions worldwide, before losing his life, along with his wife and son and son’s friend, when Malaysia Airlines flight MH17 was shot down by a missile over the Ukraine on 17 July 2014.

References

Varella, H.R., M.V. Loeb, Lima F.C.T. and S.O. Kullander, 2018. Crenicichla ploegi, a new species of pike-cichlid of the C. saxatilis group from the Rio Juruena and upper Rio Paraguai basins in Brazil, with an updated diagnosis and biogeographical comments on the group (Teleostei: Cichlidae). Zootaxa 4377(3):361-386 

ploegi
Freshwater fish of Brazil
Taxa named by Henrique Rosa Varella
Taxa named by Marina V. Loeb
Taxa named by Flávio César Thadeo de Lima
Taxa named by Sven O. Kullander
Fish described in 2018